David Morillas Jiménez (born 28 September 1986) is a Spanish footballer who plays as a left back for AD Alcorcón.

Club career
Born in Águilas, Region of Murcia, Morillas made his debut with Cuevas CF in the regional leagues, in 2005. He first arrived in Segunda División B only in 2009, after spells at CA Pulpileño (where he scored a career-best ten goals during his first and only campaign) and Polideportivo Ejido B, agreeing to a contract with Águilas CF.

Morillas remained in the third division in the following years, representing CD Roquetas, UB Conquense, Arroyo CP, La Hoya Lorca CF and SD Huesca. With the latter he achieved promotion to Segunda División at the end of the campaign, appearing in 44 matches.

Morillas made his professional debut on 22 August 2015, playing the full 90 minutes in a 2–3 home loss against Deportivo Alavés. On 3 November, he renewed his contract until 2017.

On 29 August 2016, Morillas signed a two-year contract with fellow league team UCAM Murcia CF, after rescinding with Huesca. He scored his first professional goal on 20 May of the following year, his team's third in a 3–1 home win against his former club Huesca.

On 6 July 2017, after suffering relegation with UCAM, Morillas joined Albacete Balompié also in the second tier. On 23 July of the following year, he moved to fellow league team CF Rayo Majadahonda.

On 20 July 2019, Morillas joined UD Ibiza in the third division. He was a regular starter in the club's first-ever promotion to the second level, before leaving on 18 May 2022.

On 27 July 2022, 35-year-old Morillas joined AD Alcorcón in Primera Federación.

References

External links

1986 births
Living people
People from Águilas
Spanish footballers
Footballers from the Region of Murcia
Association football defenders
Segunda División players
Segunda División B players
Tercera División players
Divisiones Regionales de Fútbol players
Águilas CF players
CD Roquetas footballers
UB Conquense footballers
Arroyo CP players
Lorca FC players
SD Huesca footballers
UCAM Murcia CF players
Albacete Balompié players
CF Rayo Majadahonda players
UD Ibiza players